Lee Bey is a Chicago-based photographer, writer, lecturer and consultant. His work documents and interprets built environments and the political, social and racial forces that shape spaces and places. A former Chicago Sun-Times architecture critic, Bey’s writing, reporting, and photography on architecture and urban design have been featured in Architectural Record, the Houston Chronicle, Crain’s Chicago Business, WBEZ Chicago Public Radio, Fox News Chicago, Architect, Chicago Architect, Old House Journal, Cite (magazine), Bauwelt, and Modulør.

Bey also served as Deputy Chief of Staff for Planning and Design for Chicago Mayor Richard M. Daley and was involved in a variety of issues that ranged from housing developments to architectural preservation from 2001 to 2004.

Early life
Bey was born in Chicago, Illinois. He graduated from Chicago Vocational High School where he prepared for a career as a printing press operator, but decided to go to college and pursue a career in journalism after receiving praise from a teacher about his writing.

Work
As part of the 2017 Chicago Architecture Biennial, Bey created an exhibit titled "Chicago: A Southern Exposure." Housed at the DuSable Museum of African American History, the exhibit was named by Chicago Magazine one of "Three Must-See Events at the Chicago Architecture Biennial.". Bey developed the exhibit into a full-length illustrated book about South Side architecture published in October 2019 by Northwestern University Press.

External links
LeeBey.com

References

Journalists from Illinois
1965 births
Living people
Chicago Sun-Times people